Ragnar Gustafsson (20 July 1930 – 24 February 2016) was a Swedish equestrian. He competed in two events at the 1960 Summer Olympics.

References

1930 births
2016 deaths
Swedish male equestrians
Olympic equestrians of Sweden
Equestrians at the 1960 Summer Olympics
Sportspeople from Stockholm